Topincs is a software for rapid development of web databases and web applications. It is based on LAMP and the semantic technology Topic Maps. A Topincs web database makes information accessible through browsing very much like a Wiki. Editing a page on a subject is done through forms rather than markup editing. A web database can be tailored into a web application to provide specific user groups a contextualized approach to the data.

All modeling and development tasks are performed in the web browser. No other development tools are necessary. The server requires Apache, MySQL and PHP. The client works on any standards-compliant web browser on desktops, laptops, tablets, and mobile phones. The layout is automatically adjusted to smaller screens.

The programmatic access to data is done via a virtual object-oriented programming interface which is set up over the schema in a few minutes. It is interpreted rather than generated. Portions of the database can be pulled into memory to accelerate bulk access.

Features
 Browseable data
 High-quality web forms
 Little to no programming
 Development done in the browser, no other tools required
 Client runs in any standard-compliant web browser
 Virtual object-oriented programming interface
 User interface adjusts to screen size
 Supports desktops, laptops, tablets, and mobile phones
 Flexible data modeling

Challenges
 Requires rethinking the development process and dropping many hard learned habits
 Requires a familiarity with two ISO standards ISO 13259 and 19756
 Forms cannot be easily adjusted in layout and behavior
 Server installation difficult and prone to error

License
Topincs can be used in a private network for any purpose for free. The use in a public network is restricted to non-commercial applications.

See also
 Topic Maps
 Rapid application development
 Metamodeling

References

External links
 Official website
 Topincs: A software for rapid development of web databases
 Modeling Topic Maps in Topincs

Web frameworks
Cross-platform mobile software
Development toolkits and libraries
Computer libraries
Web development software
Integrated development environments
User interface builders